The Chinatrust Whales (中信鯨), formerly Koos Group Whales (和信鯨), were a Taiwanese professional baseball team. Founded as an amateur team in 1991, this club became professional and joined the Chinese Professional Baseball League (CPBL) in 1997. It is administered by the Chinatrust Financial Holding Company. The Whales have never won a CPBL championship. On November 11, 2008, it was announced that the team would disband due to financial losses of the Chinatrust Group.

History
In 1997, the amateur Chinatrust Whales Baseball Team was professionalized and became the seventh member of Chinese Professional Baseball League; however, because Taiwan forbid financial institutions to invest in unrelated market, the ownership of the team had to be transferred to Koos Group (和信集團), which was also the owner of Chinatrust, thus the team was named KG Whales when it began its first season. Initially, the Whales played their home games at the Chiayi Baseball Field.  The team has not had any notable success over the course of its history with only two appearances in the Championship series, winning only a single game over the course of those two series while dropping eight. In 2002, because of the split of Chinatrust and the Koo Group, the ownership of the Whales were transferred back to Chinatrust and renamed Chinatrust Whales. The organization disbanded after the 2008 season.

Although owned by the same parent corporation, Chinatrust Whales and Chinatrust Brothers are two separate organization with separate franchise histories. Chinatrust acquired the Brothers organization from Brother Hotel in December 2013, five years after the Whales folded.

Records

Regular seasons

Playoffs

External links 
The Chinatrust Financial Holding Company official website
The CPBL official website

Defunct baseball teams in Taiwan
Baseball teams established in 1991
Baseball teams disestablished in 2008
1991 establishments in Taiwan
2008 disestablishments in Taiwan

 
Whales and humans